Steven James Minnikin (born 9 July 1965) is an Australian Liberal National politician who is currently serving as the member of the Legislative Assembly of Queensland for Chatsworth, having defeated Steve Kilburn at the 2012 state election.

Early life and education 
Minnikin was born in Brisbane on the 9th of July 1965  and has lived the majority of his life in the Chatsworth electorate. Growing up in Carina, he attended Carina State School before completing his secondary education at Coorparoo Secondary College. Upon graduating school, he completed his tertiary education at both the University of Queensland and the Queensland University of Technology, where he attained a Bachelor of Business and a Master of Property Economics respectively.

Career
Before his election to Parliament, Minnikin initially worked in local government as an Executive Officer and Customer Service Manager for the Redland Shire Council. He subsequently went on to work in the property sector, holding several senior roles including State Development Manager for Australand and National Development Manager for the Peninsula Development Group.

Politics 
Minnikin was the President of the Queensland Young Liberals from 1992 to 1993 and served on the QLD State Executive of the then Liberal Party during this period.

In the lead up to the 2012 Queensland state election, he defeated future Newman Government Minister Ian Walker and former candidate Andrea Caltabiano for pre-selection to be endorsed as the Liberal National candidate for Chatsworth. Following the election of the Newman Government, he was appointed Assistant Minister for Public Transport on 3 April 2012.

After the defeat of the Newman Government at the 2015 Queensland state election, he was appointed Deputy Opposition Whip by Lawrence Springborg. He held that role until 22 February 2016 when, following his involvement in a failed party leadership coup against Springborg, he was replaced by Ros Bates. He subsequently regained this position three months later following Springborg's defeat in a leadership spill to Tim Nicholls on the 6th of May 2016. In the lead up to the 2017 Queensland state election he was appointed Shadow Minister for Aboriginal and Torres Strait Islander Partnerships and Multicultural Affairs by Tim Nicholls, replacing the former Shadow Minister Fiona Simpson who had resigned from Shadow Cabinet for personal reasons.

Following the election, Minnikin was appointed Shadow Minister for Transport and Main Roads by the then Opposition Leader Deb Frecklington. He has subsequently continued in this role post the LNP's defeat at the 2020 Queensland state election, while gaining the added portfolio responsibility of Shadow Minister for Customer Service under the leadership of David Crisafulli.

Political positions 
Minnikin is considered to be from the moderate wing of the Liberal National Party. He is known to be economically conservative, whilst holding 'socially progressive liberal' viewpoints on social issues.

Decriminalisation of abortion 
Alongside of Tim Nicholls and Jann Stuckey he was one of the three LNP politicians who used their conscience vote to support the decriminalisation of abortion in Queensland on 17 October 2018. In his speech to parliament in support of abortion being removed from Queensland's criminal code, Minnikin stated "I believe in the fundamental right of women to be treated as equal members of a free society which acknowledges that, although there are obvious differences in men's and women's physiology, there should be no difference in their opportunity to have sovereign reign over their own bodies". 
 
He further clarified his view on the issue stating, "No-one should be forced to endure a pregnancy they do not want when safe, modern medical options are available to assist them. I am not pro abortion; I am pro choice, pro autonomy, pro respect. I support the right of all Queensland women to make reproductive choices that respect their agency, individuality, desires and dreams. In the 21st century this issue should, indeed, be a health issue and not a criminal issue".

Jewish community 
Minnikin has also been an outspoken advocate for the State of Israel and the broader Jewish community in Australia. He established the Queensland Parliamentary Friends of Israel group in 2013 and has Chaired the organisation ever since. In that capacity he joined a bipartisan Australian parliamentary delegation visiting Israel in January 2020.

See also
Shadow ministry of David Crisafulli
Shadow ministry of Deb Frecklington
Shadow ministry of Tim Nicholls
Shadow ministry of Lawrence Springborg
Newman Ministry

References

External links 
 

1965 births
Living people
Members of the Queensland Legislative Assembly
Liberal National Party of Queensland politicians
University of Queensland alumni
Queensland University of Technology alumni
21st-century Australian politicians